Colling is a surname. Notable people with the surname include:

Belinda Colling (born 1975), New Zealand netball and basketball player
Gary Colling (born 1950), Australian rules footballer
James Kellaway Colling, (1816–1905), English artist and architect
Lin Colling (1946–2003), New Zealand rugby union player
Nancie Colling (1919–2020), English lawn bowls competitor
Richard G. Colling, biologist
Robert Colling (1749–1820), English cattle breeder

See also
Colling, Michigan, unincorporated community in Tuscola County, Michigan, United States
Collin (disambiguation)
Cooling (disambiguation)